Brock Hotel, also known as the Brock House, is a historic hotel located at Summersville, Nicholas County, West Virginia.  It was built about 1890, and is a large 2½-story, frame dwelling. It features broad, shady porches and high pitched twin gables in a vernacular Queen Anne style. It measures approximately 48 feet wide and 40 feet deep.  It operated as a hotel until about 1914.

It was listed on the National Register of Historic Places in 1993.

References

Hotel buildings on the National Register of Historic Places in West Virginia
Buildings and structures in Nicholas County, West Virginia
Defunct hotels in West Virginia
National Register of Historic Places in Nicholas County, West Virginia
Queen Anne architecture in West Virginia